San Luis Obispo station is an Amtrak intercity rail station in the city of San Luis Obispo, California, United States. It is the northern terminus of two daily round trips of the Pacific Surfliner and is served by the daily Coast Starlight. It has one side platform and one island platform serving the two tracks of the Coast Line.

History

The present Spanish Colonial Revival architecture style depot was built by the Southern Pacific Railroad and opened on September 5, 1943. It replaced the original SP depot, located just south of the current one, which opened on May 4, 1894. After the present depot opened, the former depot was then used for freight until it was shuttered in 1968.  It was demolished to make room for a parking lot in 1971.

For most of Amtrak's first three decades, the station was only served by the Coast Starlight, which ran southbound in the afternoon and northbound in mid-morning. In 1995, Amtrak and CalTrans extended the San Diegan all the way to San Luis Obispo. That route had long been a Los Angeles–San Diego service, but had been extended up the Central Coast to provide that region with additional service to Los Angeles. The San Diegan was rebranded as the Pacific Surfliner five years later.

The station has room for a single Surfliner passenger train adjacent to the station to hold overnight for a morning departure from San Luis Obispo. The Los Angeles – San Diego – San Luis Obispo (LOSSAN) Rail Corridor Agency is planning an expanded facility on the  Union Pacific property just south of the station. This property still contains the foundation of the Southern Pacific roundhouse and the pit where the turntable resided until 1994. The proposed layout of the CCLF would require destruction of most of these historic landmarks, and prevent the future rebuilding of the railroad facility for historic and public use. The proposed additional storage and maintenance capacity will also allow a second train to layover and provide for future expansion of service.

See also 
 City of San Luis Obispo Historic Resources

References

External links 

Amtrak stations in San Luis Obispo County, California
Buildings and structures in San Luis Obispo, California
Spanish Colonial Revival architecture in California
Railway stations in the United States opened in 1894
Former Southern Pacific Railroad stations in California
1894 establishments in California